Theodore J. Garrish (born January 6, 1943) is an American politician and attorney, who served as the Assistant Secretary of Energy for International Affairs. He was nominated to the position by President Donald Trump and confirmed by the United States Senate in April 2018.

Garrish was born in Detroit, Michigan. He graduated from the University of Michigan with a degree in economics, and received his Juris Doctor degree from Wayne State University Law School. At the start of his federal career, Garrish worked as legislative counsel at the United States Department of the Interior during the Nixon administration.

Garrish has served as the United States Department of Energy's General Counsel, Assistant Secretary for Nuclear Energy, and Assistant Secretary for Congressional, Intergovernmental and Public Affairs. He also served as Federal Inspector of the Alaskan Natural Gas Transportation System. Garrish was a member of the Price–Anderson Nuclear Commission and the Civil Nuclear Trade Advisory Committee (CINTAC).

References 

Living people
Nixon administration personnel
Reagan administration personnel
Trump administration personnel
Maryland Republicans
1943 births
University of Michigan College of Literature, Science, and the Arts alumni
Wayne State University Law School alumni
Politicians from Detroit
Michigan Republicans